Charles Edward Adams (1 October 1870 – 31 October 1945) was a New Zealand university lecturer, surveyor, astronomer and seismologist.  His father, Charles William Adams, emigrated from Tasmania in 1862 and was also a surveyor and astronomer. Charles was born on 1 October 1870 in Lawrence, New Zealand, educated at the University of Canterbury (then Canterbury College) and then lectured at Lincoln University and Victoria University of Wellington before becoming government astronomer.

References

1870 births
1945 deaths
New Zealand educators
Academic staff of the Victoria University of Wellington
New Zealand surveyors
University of Canterbury alumni
People from Lawrence, New Zealand
New Zealand seismologists
20th-century New Zealand astronomers